Animals United is a 2010 German computer-animated fantasy adventure comedy film directed and produced by Reinhard Klooss and Holger Tappe. It was released on October 7, 2010, in Germany. The film stars Ralf Schmitz and Thomas Fritsch as a meerkat named Billy and a lion named Socrates, who go on an epic quest to discover why their river has unexpectedly dried up. It is based on the 1949 book of the same name by Erich Kästner. The screenplay for the film was written by Oliver Huzly and Reinhard Kloos. An English dub version for Animals United stars an ensemble cast, including James Corden, Stephen Fry and Andy Serkis.

A sequel, Pets United, was released in 2019 and in Dolby Cinema which exclusively brought the sequel to Netflix.

Plot
In the Okavango Delta in Botswana, the annual flood has failed to arrive in the Delta. The water has become scarce and the native animals including a herd of rhinos and buffaloes, including Chino and Biggie, fiercely fight over it. A grey meerkat named Billy and a lion named Socrates set out to find more water, and during their quest they enter a scary and dingy place called "The Valley of Death" and then are met by a rag-tag group of animals from across the world: a polar bear named Sushi, a kangaroo named Toby, a Tasmanian devil named Smiley, two Galápagos tortoises named Winifred and Winston, and a rooster named Charles, all of whom have had their lives ruined by humans in some way and have travelled to Africa. That night, Socrates tells Billy the tragic story of how he and his brother Mambo entered "The Valley of Death" and how Mambo was shot a strange poacher. The next morning, the animals discover the reason for the lack of water in the Delta: a dam has been constructed to supply energy for a luxury resort called the Eden Paradise Hotel which is for the Climate Conference owned by a man named Mr. Smith. The animals meet a chimpanzee named Toto who is the hotel's mascot, Toto helps the animals get their water back, however, a poacher named Hunter kidnaps Socrates, while the other animals escape. 

The animals hold a conference where Winifred and Winston explain the deadly future that could be possible for animals. After the conference, however, Winifred and Winston pass away. That day, Billy and the other animals travel through "The Valley of Death" towards the dam. Hunter spots the animals and tries to stop them with a bi-plane, but is stopped by Toto. The animals then began to send a message by letting a swarm of locusts teach the humans a lesson for stealing the water by eating everything in their conference room, including their documents and their clothes. Billy rescues Socrates and they escape down a chute with the help from Toto. The animals chase Hunter and threaten to lower him to the den of tigers if he doesn't tell them why he blocked the water, ending with Billy doing a well-karate chop knocking the poacher out. The water then comes out of the dam making everyone celebrate the return of the water and invite Toto to live with them.

Characters

Meerkats
Billy is an adventurous, clumsy, easily scared but good-hearted and caring green-eyed gray meerkat who wants to find water to drink - to collect which he carries a bottle made out of an orange gourd, complete with cork. He also likes to golf, drum and sing.
Bonnie - Billy's wife and loyal but concerned member of the meerkat family. She has tan fur and light brown eyes compared to her husband's gray fur and green eyes.
Junior - the son of Billy and Bonnie who aspires to do some of the things his father does, such as collecting water in a gourd.
Other meerkats - often tease Junior about his father's promise, but are convinced at the end.

Other animals
Socrates - A vegetarian lion with a scar on his face and Billy's best friend. His dream is for all animals to be on harmony
Angie - The elephant with blond hair tied in a ponytail.
Giselle - A giraffe with makeup on her face and blond bangs on her head. She is also Angie's best friend.
Winston - An elderly male Galápagos tortoise who has been alive for more than 700 years. He's 12 years older than his wife, Winifred. He dies shortly before the climax of the film.
Winifred - An elderly female Galápagos tortoise and Winston's wife who is also more than 700 years old. She and her husband die shortly before the film's climax.
Charles - The Chicken with a French accent who leads the other animals on some revolution against human oppression, originally served as food on a cruise ship.
Sushi - A Polar bear who has been forced from her home by global warming.
Toby - A Red kangaroo with droopy ears. Despite being a male Toby has a pouch. He likes to drink from cans.
Ken - A hippie Koala who's been rescued by a man after another set the outback on fire.
Smiley - The Tasmanian devil whom Toby befriends. In addition to his lack of intelligence, clumsiness and inability to speak, Smiley is notorious for his terrible flatulence, but he is also caring, friendly and loyal.
Toto - The Chimpanzee who served as an animal test subject at the hotel.
Biggie - A red-haired white rhinoceros]who fights Chino in a butting over drinks
Chino - A African Buffalo who fights Biggie.
Bob - The Aardvark who trumpets like an elephant.
The Leopard - A Black Panther living in the canyon and becomes a vegetarian after fearing Charles for his courageous act.
Bongo - A maroon leaf monkey that works as a hairdresser for other animals and also poses as an oracle.

Humans
Mr. Smith - the tour guide of the hotel who initially cares nothing for animals and is interested only in making money. At the end, when the animals have got their water back, his hotel goes bankrupt.
Maya Smith - Smith's animal-loving daughter.
Hunter - a unnamed selfish and unscrupulous poacher. He has earlier killed Socrates' brother Mambo, but is defeated by the animals near the end of the movie.

Voice cast

German
Ralf Schmitz as Erdmännchen Billy
Thomas Fritsch as Löwe Sokrates
Bastian Pastewka as Elefantenkuh Angie
Bianca Krahl as Giraffe Gisela
Margot Rothweiler as Schildkröte Winifred
Peter Gröger as Schildkröte Winston
Constantin von Jascheroff as Erdmännchen
Nicola Devico Mamone as Büffel Chino
Christoph Maria Herbst as Hahn Charles
Oliver Kalkofe as Hoteldirektor Smith
Frank Schaff as Erdmännchen
Tilo Schmitz as Nashorn Biggie
Santiago Ziesmer as Affiger Friseur Bongo

English dub
 James Corden as Billy the Meerkat
 Stephen Fry as Socrates the Lion
 Dawn French as Angie the Elephant 
 Joanna Lumley as Giselle the Giraffe 
 Jim Broadbent as Winston the Tortoise 
 Vanessa Redgrave as Winifred the Tortoise 
 Billie Piper as Bonnie the Meerkat
 Tom Wayland as Bob the Aardvark
 Andy Serkis as Charles the Cockerel
 Jason Donovan as Toby the Kangaroo 
 Omid Djalili as Bongo the Monkey
 Mischa Goodman as Junior the Meerkat 
 Bella Hudson as Sushi the Polar Bear 
 Oliver Green as Ken the Koala 
 Jason Griffith as Toto the Chimpanzee
 Sean Schemmel as Biggie the Rhinoceros
 Marc Thompson as Chino the Buffalo
 Oliver Wyman as Smiley the Tasmanian Devil 
 Ruben Lloyd, Jimmy Zoppi and Gary McHenley as vultures
 Michael Glover as Mr. Smith 
 Kim Holland as Maya Smith 
 Veronica Taylor as The Mole
 Marc Diraison as Peter Cook the TV News Reporter
 Doug Preis as Hunter

Production
The film was produced by German company Constantin Film. The film was animated in German, and dubbed by both British and New York voice actors into the English-language.

Release
Animals United was released in theaters on October 7, 2010, in Germany.

Home media
This film was released on Blu-ray and DVD in the US in 2012 by Arc Entertainment. A Blu-ray 3D release in North America has not been announced yet.

Reception
Reviews for the film were generally unfavourable, with the aggregation website Rotten Tomatoes reporting that 25% of critics have given the film a positive review, with an average rating 3.8 out of 10. A review in The Hollywood Reporter described the film as a "bombastic CGI-effort that aims at the big leagues, but preaches too much while entertaining too little to unite internationally."

Soundtrack 

The soundtrack album for the film was composed by David Newman. It features songs performed by various artists, including Naturally 7, Charles Trénet and Xavier Naidoo. It was released on 7 December 2010 in Germany through Königskinder Music in CD and digital download formats, and is also available on iTunes.

Track listing 
All musical score tracks for the film written and composed by David Newman, except where noted.

Note: Roger Thomas of Naturally 7 provides Billy's singing voice for tracks 3 and 4.

References

External links
 

2010 films
2010 3D films
2010 comedy films
2010 fantasy films
2010 computer-animated films
2010s German animated films
2010s children's adventure films
2010s children's comedy films
2010s children's fantasy films
2010s children's animated films
2010s adventure comedy films
2010s fantasy adventure films
2010s fantasy comedy films
2010s English-language films
2010s German-language films
German 3D films
German computer-animated films
German children's adventure films
German children's comedy films
German animated fantasy films
German adventure comedy films
German fantasy adventure films
German fantasy comedy films
Remakes of German films
Animated adventure films
Animated comedy films
3D animated films
English-language German films
Animated films based on novels
Films based on German novels
Animated films based on children's books
Films based on works by Erich Kästner
Films about meerkats
Animated films about families
Animated films about lions
Animated films about elephants
Animated films about turtles
Animated films about chickens
Films about polar bears
Animated films about kangaroos and wallabies
Animated films about koalas
Fictional Tasmanian devils
Fictional chimpanzees
Animated films about apes
Talking animals in fiction
Films about hunters
Films about death
Films set in Africa
Animated films set in New York City
Films directed by Reinhard Klooss
Films scored by David Newman
2010s German films